Choi Yu-na (born October 4, 1997), better known by her stage name Yuju, is a South Korean singer. She participated in various singing competitions and signed with Source Music in 2014. She is a former member of the South Korean girl group GFriend and is currently active as a soloist.

Yuju is the first Korean female idol to be declared as the winner on Fantastic Duo 2.

Career

2011–2021: Pre-debut and career with GFriend
In 2011, she competed in the first season of K-pop Star, where she was eliminated in the first round.

In January 2015, Yuju made her debut as a member of GFriend with the song "Glass Bead". A few months later the group released their second single, named "Me Gustas Tu". During the promotions of the song, while performing on a slippery stage, GFriend members fell on the stage eight times, gaining international attention. The group was praised for their professionalism, especially Yuju, who suffered a twisted finger during the performance. Their next song, "Rough", won 15 times on music show programs.

Yuju sang "Spring Is Gone by Chance" for the South Korean television drama The Girl Who Sees Smells with Loco. The song won "OST Chart First Place" ten weeks in a row on Music Bank and "Best OST" at the 2015 Melon Music Awards. An acoustic version of the song was also released. The soundtrack has already achieved 100M+ Digital Index and 2.5M+ Downloads on Gaon, making it the one of the several OSTs whose given a Streaming and Downloads Certifications on the platform.

Yuju recorded "Billy & The Brave Guys", for the soundtrack of the animated movie Chicken Hero, which was released on February 18, 2016. In March 2016, she collaborated with Sunyoul of Up10tion for a song called "Cherish".

In October 2017, she collaborated with Jihoo of IZ for a song titled "Heart Signal".

She also appeared on South Korean television show SBS' Fantastic Duo (Season 2) Ep. 27-28 and declared as the Final Winner of the episode, along with Wheesung performing their winning piece "The Heartbreaking Story". She is the first and only K-pop Female Idol to win on the said television show, competing among 5 contentants whose picked over 8 potential nominees on Everysing app. The duo won $10,000 as a prize.

In June 2018, she released a digital single entitled "Love Rain" featuring Suran.

On May 4, 2021, she became the host and protagonist of "Yuju is Halli Queen", as the defending champion in Halli Galli; her gaming name is Hallelujah.

On May 5, 2021, Yuju served as MC for KBS "Korean Children's Song Contest".

2021–present: New agency, solo debut with Rec., and O
On September 1, 2021, Yuju signed an exclusive contract with Konnect Entertainment, following GFriend's disbandment and departure from Source Music.

Yuju debuted as a soloist on January 18, 2022, with the extended play Rec. and its lead single "Play" (놀이). This is her first solo release under Konnect Entertainment and after GFriend's disbandment. On July 28, 2022, she released her second digital single "Evening" featuring rapper Big Naughty.

On February 13, 2023, it was announced Yuju would be releasing her second extended play titled O alongside the lead single "Without U" on March 7.

Discography

Extended plays

Singles

Soundtrack appearances

Composition credits 
All song credits are adapted from the Korea Music Copyright Association's database unless stated otherwise.

Videography

Music videos

Awards and nominations

Notes

References

External links
 
  
 

Living people
1997 births
People from Goyang
GFriend members
South Korean women pop singers
South Korean female idols
K-pop Star participants
School of Performing Arts Seoul alumni
Melon Music Award winners
21st-century South Korean singers
21st-century South Korean women singers
Sungshin Women's University alumni
South Korean mezzo-sopranos
Konnect Entertainment artists
Hybe Corporation artists
Choe clan of Jeonju